The following is a list of flags of Ukraine:

State flag

Presidential Standard

Military flags

Flags of service branches

Command Standards

Maritime flags

Former flags

Personal naval flags

Former flags

Government and non-military security forces

Flags of Ukrainian regions

Flags of oblasts

Flags of cities with special status

Flags of other cities

Regional and minority flags

Historical flags

Kingdom of Galicia–Volhynia

Kingdom of Galicia and Lodomeria

Cossack Hetmanate

Crimean Khanate (1441–1478)

Ukrainian People's Republic and Ukrainian State

Maritime flags

Royal Family Standards

Flags of occupational powers

Ottoman Empire

Poland and Lithuania

Russian Empire (1654–1917)

Maritime flags

Habsburg Monarchy, the Austrian Empire, and Austria–Hungary from 1772 to 1918

Makhnovshchina

Soviet Union and Ukrainian SSR

Miscellaneous

External links

Flags of Ukraine from Vexillographia (in Russian)

Flags

Ukraine
Flag